

Play-by-play 
John Wells: 1987–2004 (lead play-by-play announcer), 2005 (secondary play-by-play announcer)
Chris Cuthbert: 2005–2019 (lead play-by-play announcer)
Rod Black: 2002, 2005–2019 (secondary play-by-play announcer); 2021 (lead play-by-play announcer)
Glen Suitor: 2002
Gord Miller: 1995–1998, 2009–2019 (secondary play-by-play announcer)
Rod Smith: 1998–1999, 2012–2021 (secondary play-by-play announcer); 2021–present (lead play-by-play announcer)
Dave Randorf: 1999–2000 (secondary play-by-play announcer)
Farhan Lalji: 2011, 2021–present
Matt Devlin: 2012–2017 (secondary play-by-play announcer)
Dustin Nielson: 2019–present (secondary play-by-play announcer)
Marshall Ferguson: 2021–present (secondary play-by-play announcer)

Colour commentator 
Leif Pettersen: 1987–1997 (lead colour commentator), 1998, 2005–2006 (secondary colour commentator)
Glen Suitor: 1995–1997 (secondary colour commentator), 1998–present (lead colour commentator)
David Archer: 1997 (lead colour commentator) sometimes
Matt Dunigan: 1999, 2009–present (secondary colour commentator)
Danny McManus: 2007 (secondary colour commentator)
Duane Forde: 2008–present (secondary colour commentator)

Studio hosts 
Vic Rauter: 1987–1991
Gord Miller: 1992–1994
Rod Smith: 1994, 1997, 2014–2019
Darren Dutchyshen: 1995–1996
James Duthie: 1998–2000, 2014–present (occasionally)
Dave Randorf: 2001–2013
Jock Climie: 2012, 2014 (substitute)
Derek Taylor: 2017–2018 (occasionally)
Kate Beirness: 2018–present
Farhan Lalji: 2018–present (CFL Draft broadcasts and substitute)
Lindsay Hamilton: 2022 (substitute)

Studio analysts 
Bob O'Billovich: 1996–1997
Less Browne: 1996–1997
Marty York: 1996–1997
Chris Schultz: 1998–2017
Eric Tillman: 1998, 2000–2001
Matt Dunigan: 1999–2003, 2005–present
Jock Climie: 2002–2018
Milt Stegall: 2009–present
Dave Naylor: 2010–present (occasionally)
Paul LaPolice: 2012–2015, 2022 (substitute)
Doug Brown: 2012 (substitute)
Mike Benevides: 2015, 2019
Henry Burris: 2017–2019
Derek Taylor: 2017–2018 (primarily video animations)
Davis Sanchez: 2018–present
Jim Barker: 2018–2021 (occasionally)

Notes
1. During the 2002 season Rod Black and Glen Suitor filled in for John Wells who missed games due to illness.
2. During Week 6 of the 2011 season Farhan Lalji filled in for Chris Cuthbert, whose missed the game due to the death of his father.

References

CFL on TSN
The Sports Network